The Bernard H.V.120 was a 1930s French racing seaplane designed and built by Bernard to compete in the Schneider Trophy race. Delays caused by engine problems and the crash of the second aircraft delayed entry and the aircraft did not race in the competition.

Design and development
The H.V.120 was a wooden single-seat mid-wing cantilever monoplane with twin floats and powered by a  Hispano Suiza 18R W-18 piston engine. The first H.V.120 flew for the first time at Hourtin on 25 March 1930. Development was delayed due to engine problems, as well as technical issues it was overweight we meant the engine mount and forward fuselage had to be re-designed. The first aircraft had a three-bladed propeller but the second had a four-bladed Chauvière propeller. The second aircraft crashed into the water on its first flight in July 1931 killing the pilot. In 1933 the prototype was converted into a racing landplane as the Bernard V.4.

The V.4 had widely spaced main landing gear with streamlined wheel spats. It was moved to Istres in December 1933 to try and achieve a French Air Ministry prize for a French aircraft to beat the world speed record before January 1934. It was due to make an attempt to fly on 27 December 1933 but strong winds kept the aircraft grounded. Further attempts in February 1934 to fly were thwarted by engine problems and lack of government finance. The project was abandoned without the aircraft have flown.

Variants

H.V.120-01
Prototype, first flew 25 March 1930 had a direct drive three-bladed propeller.
H.V.120-02
Fatal crash on first flight in July 1931, had a reduction gear to drive a four-bladed propeller
V.4
Prototype H.V.120 re-built as a landplane in 1933 with a  Hispano-Suiza 18Sb engine and shorter span wings, not flown.

Specifications (H.V.120-01)

References

Notes

Bibliography

1930s French sport aircraft
Floatplanes
Single-engined tractor aircraft
HV120
Aircraft first flown in 1930
Mid-wing aircraft